HNLMS Eland Dubois was a  of the Royal Netherlands Navy that served in World War II.

Service history
Eland Dubois was scuttled in the Madura Strait on 8 March 1942 after faulty boilers made it impossible for her to reach the safety of Australia.

Jan van Amstel-class minesweepers
1936 ships
World War II minesweepers of the Netherlands
World War II shipwrecks in the Pacific Ocean
Maritime incidents in March 1942
Ships built by Gusto Shipyard
Scuttled vessels